Juanita Venter (born 2 August 1976) is a South African professional racing cyclist. In February 2016 she won the South African National Time Trial Championships.

References

External links
 

1976 births
Living people
South African female cyclists
Place of birth missing (living people)